Taxtakópir (Karakalpak: Тахтакөпир, Taxtakópir) is an urban-type settlement and seat of the Taxtakópir district in Karakalpakstan in Uzbekistan.

The town has been the seat of Taxtakópir district since 1984. It has six public schools and two vocational colleges.

In 1989, during the last Soviet census, the population was recorded as 15,022 (7,553 men and 7,469 women). The population in 2004 was 17,100.

References

Populated places in Karakalpakstan
Urban-type settlements in Uzbekistan